Margarinotus stygicus is a species of clown beetle in the family Histeridae. It is found in North America.

References

Further reading

 
 

Histeridae
Beetles of North America
Beetles described in 1845
Taxa named by John Eatton Le Conte
Articles created by Qbugbot